Balacra alberici is a moth of the family Erebidae. It was described by Abel Dufrane in 1945. It is found in the Democratic Republic of the Congo.

References

Balacra
Moths described in 1945
Erebid moths of Africa